John C. "Jay" Cocks Jr. (born January 12, 1944) is an American film critic and screenwriter. He is a graduate of Kenyon College. He was a critic for Time, Newsweek, and Rolling Stone, among other magazines, before shifting to screenplay writing. He was married to actress Verna Bloom from 1972 until her death in 2019. They had a son, Sam, born in 1981.

As a screenwriter, he is notable for his collaborations with director Martin Scorsese, particularly The Age of Innocence and Gangs of New York — a screenplay he started working on in 1976 — as well as Kathryn Bigelow's Strange Days. He did an uncredited rewrite of James Cameron's screenplay for Titanic and was, with Scorsese, the co-screenwriter of Silence. Cocks and Scorsese approached author Philip K. Dick in 1969 for an adaptation of his 1968 novel Do Androids Dream of Electric Sheep? Though the duo never optioned the book, it was later developed into the movie Blade Runner by screenwriter Hampton Fancher and director Ridley Scott.

Works

References

External links

1944 births
American film critics
American male screenwriters
Place of birth missing (living people)
Kenyon College alumni
Living people
American male non-fiction writers